Krøkjebreen ("The Bent Glacier") is a glacier in Torell Land at Spitsbergen, Svalbard. It has a length of nine kilometers. Krøkjebreen is part of the Liestølbreen glacier complex, situated between the mountains of Arrheniusfjellet and Wijkberget.

References

Glaciers of Spitsbergen